The 2001 NCAA Women's Gymnastics championship involved 12 schools competing for the national championship in women's NCAA Division I gymnastics.  It was the twentieth NCAA gymnastics national championship and took place in Athens, Georgia, hosted by the University of Georgia in Stegeman Coliseum.  The 2001 Championship was won by UCLA, which also won the 2000 Championship. Onnie Willis, UCLA, 39.525, and Elise Ray, Michigan, 39.525 shared the individual championship.

Team Results

Session 1

Session 2

Super Six

References

External links
 NCAA Gymnastics Championship Official site

NCAA Women's Gymnastics championship
NCAA Women's Gymnastics Championship